Hangman's Hymn: Musikalische Exequien is an album by the Japanese heavy metal band Sigh. It is their first album for The End Records. Audio samples on The End website suggest Sigh have kept their clean vocals style as shown on their previous album as well as returned to a black metal-styled vocalization.

Their 2007 song "Inked in Blood" from the album Hangman's Hymn was named number 31 on Loudwire's list of the Top 21st Century Metal Songs.

Track listing

Personnel
Mirai Kawasima - Vocal, orchestrations, piano
Satoshi Fujinami - Bass
Shinichi Ishikawa - Guitar
Junichi Harashima - Drums
Rob Urbinati (Sacrifice) - Guitar solo on #4
Mike "Gunface" McKenzie (The Red Chord) - Guitar solo on #7
Chuck Keller (Ares Kingdom) - Guitar solo on #5
Aurielle Gregory (Giant Squid) - Female vocal on #4
Tim Conroy - Trumpet on #1, #4, #10
Steven Sagala (Enforsaken) - Requiem choir
Void (Samas) - Requiem choir
Glendalis Gonzalez - Requiem choir
Claire Joseph - Requiem choir
Zack Bissell - Requiem choir
Grant Taylor - Requiem choir
T. Osada – Audio engineering
James Murphy – Mastering engineer

References

External links
Hangman's Hymn at The End Records
Mirai's post at The Slaughter Garden website

2007 albums
Sigh (band) albums
The End Records albums